Colorado Student Space Weather Experiment (CSSWE) was the sixth National Science Foundation sponsored CubeSat mission.  It was built by students at the University of Colorado at Boulder with advising from professionals at the Laboratory for Atmospheric and Space Physics.  The CSSWE mission was a joint effort by the University of Colorado's Department of Aerospace Engineering Sciences and Laboratory for Atmospheric and Space Physics.  The mission principal investigator was Prof. Xinlin Li, and the Co-PIs are Prof. Scott Palo and Dr. Shri Kanekal. The project manager for the project was Dr. Lauren Blum, the system engineer was Dr. David Gerhardt, and the instrument scientist was Dr. Quintin Schiller.

CSSWE launched on September 13, 2012, on an Atlas V rocket by the United Launch Alliance on  ELaNa-VI as part of the NASA's CubeSat Launch Initiative (CSLI).  The CSSWE team released its science products to the public for download on NASA's Coordinated Data Analysis Web Site (CDAWeb).

As of December 22, 2014, CSSWE showed severe battery degradation, likely due to pushing the battery thousands of cycles beyond the battery's design specs.  As a result, CSSWE cannot retain enough power to receive or transmit data.

Mission Objective

CSSWE's mission objective is to study space weather from a near-Earth orbit (480 km x 780 km).  Specifically, CSSWE works in conjunction with concurrent missions (such as the Van Allen Probes, BARREL, and SAMPEX) to address the following questions: 1) How does solar flare location, magnitude, and frequency elate to the timing, duration, and energy spectrum of solar energetic particles (SEPs) reaching Earth and 2) How the spectrum and dynamics of Earth's radiation belt electrons evolve.

Science Instrument

CSSWE's science instrument, the Relativistic Electron and Proton Telescope integrated little experiment (REPTile), is the only science instrument aboard and meets the mission objectives.  It is a scaled-down version of the Relativistic Electron and Proton Telescope (REPT) instrument, which is part of the Energetic Particle, Composition, and Thermal Plasma (ECT) Instrument Suite on board the Van Allen Probes.  REPTile fulfills the mission objectives by measuring electrons from 0.58 to >3.8 Megaelectronvolts (MeV) and protons from 8 to 40 MeV.  Also on the CubeSat is an onboard magnetometer to provide knowledge of spacecraft and instrument orientation with respect to Earth's magnetic field.

Pre-Flight Testing

CSSWE underwent the same rigorous testing that all space-based assets at LASP do.  In addition to component and subsystem level testing, the spacecraft underwent numerous system level tests.  It passed the thermal vacuum chamber test, in which 11 orbital cycles of the spacecraft were simulated in vacuum by increasing and decreasing the spacecraft temperature to reproduce thermal models which predict actual on-orbit temperatures.  The first few hours of the mission were reproduced by simulating launch (in which the deployment switch is released, initiating automated commissioning phase) from a mesa nearby the LASP ground station.  CSSWE passed this test by completing the initial commissioning phase, deploying its antenna, and establishing contact with the LASP ground station.  Orbital attitude tests were performed as well, including Helmholtz cage and error ellipse tests.

Launch

CSSWE was originally scheduled to launch on August 2, 2012 aboard the National Reconnaissance Office Launch-36 (NROL-36).  However, the launch was delayed three times to provide additional time for resolution of a range instrumentation issue, according to the United Launch Alliance official statement.  The Atlas V 401 eventually launched on September 13, 2012 from Vandenberg AFB Space Launch Complex 3.

The primary payload aboard NROL-36 was a classified NRO payload, so no spacecraft or orbit information was provided.  However, there were 11 CubeSats on board the rocket as secondary payloads.  The launch vehicle delivered the CubeSats into a 480x780 km orbit with an inclination of 65 degrees.  The CubeSats were carried in eight PPOD dispensers attached to the end of the Centaur rocket via the Aft Bulkhead Carrier, which replaced an unnecessary Helium tank.  Four of the CubeSats were launched as part of the NASA's Educational Launch of Nanosatellites (ELaNa) program - CSSWE (University of Colorado - Boulder), CINEMA 1 (University of California - Berkeley et al.), CXBN (Morehead State University), and CP5 (California Polytechnic University).  The remaining seven were Aeneas (operated by the University of Southern California), two SMDC-ONE (US Army), STARE-A (Lawrence Livermore National Laboratory), and three AeroCube-4 (Aerospace Corporation).

On Orbit Success

The spacecraft uses a measuring tape as an antenna to communicate with ground stations.  CSSWE was first heard beaconing telemetry packets by amateur radio operator call sign DK3WN almost exactly two hours after deployment from the PPOD, overcoming its first major hurdle.  The spacecraft completed science commissioning and was commanded into full science mode 22 days later on October 5.  Full mission success occurred on January 5, 2013 after three months of science data.  The CSSWE mission ended in December 2014 due to battery degradation.

The first science results and updated science results were presented, respectively, at the 2012 and 2013 Fall American Geophysical Union in San Francisco, CA. and published in peer-reviewed Journals such as Geophysical Review Letters, the Journal of Geophysical Research, and Science.  CSSWE now has 24 associated peer-reviewed scientific or engineering journal publications, including a paper published in Nature on 13 December 2017.

References

CubeSats
Student satellites
Spacecraft launched in 2012